Tapinoma minor is a species of ant in the genus Tapinoma. Described by Bernard in 1945, the species is endemic to Morocco.

References

Tapinoma
Hymenoptera of Africa
Insects described in 1945